Kazys Napoleonas Kitkauskas (born 1931) is a Lithuanian restoration architect, construction engineer,  and cultural activist.

Awards
1990: Lithuanian National Prize
1995: Officer's Cross of the Order of the Lithuanian Grand Duke Gediminas
1999: Commander's Cross of the Order of the Lithuanian Grand Duke Gediminas

References

1931 births
Living people
Lithuanian architects
Lithuanian engineers
Recipients of the Lithuanian National Prize